St George FC, commonly called Saints or Budapest, is a semi-professional Australian soccer club based in the St George district in the south of Sydney. The club was founded by Hungarian immigrants in 1957 as Budapest Club and by 1965 was renamed to St. George-Budapest Club.

One of the top clubs of Australia from the 1960s to the 1980s, St George currently competes in the third-highest tier of Australian soccer, the NSW League One. Their former home ground was the St George Stadium, but due to its dilapidated state, St George has played its youth and senior fixtures at Ilinden Sports Centre since 2018.

St George FC Women compete in the New South Wales League One Womens, third tier of Australian women's soccer. Their home ground is Fraser Park from 2022 due to the dilapidated state of their former home ground, St George Stadium.

History 
The club was formed shortly after the Hungarian Revolution of 1956 by Hungarian Immigrants and was originally known as Budapest. In the 1960s, led by pioneering soccer administrator Alex Pongrass, it became one of the first ethnic clubs in NSW to search for a district to call home and it chose the St George district. It later became known as St George-Budapest before shortening its name to St George some years later. They opened a licensed club, named Soccer House, in the suburb of Mortdale in 1968. In 1969 Frank Arok, the first full-time coach in Australia was appointed, serving two stints as coach, the last ending in 1983 when he left to coach the Socceroos. In between Arok's two stints as coach, Rale Rasic was coach, coaching the club at the same time as he was coaching the Socceroos. In 1971 the club was invited to an international club tournament in Tokyo, Japan. It won and remained the highest ever international achievement by an Australian club side, until South Melbourne FC  won the 1999 Oceania Club Championship. However this was surpassed by Sydney FC (Oceania champions) when they finished 5th at the FIFA World Club Cup where, before them, South Melbourne had finished 8th and Western Sydney Wanderers (Asian champions) 6th. 

Such was the dominance of St George in those days that up to 10 players on the national team would be St George players. Five of their players were in the Australian side that started against East Germany in the World Cup that year in West Germany, including the vice-captain of the side, the Australian soccer legend Johnny Warren. Another notable player (albeit at a lower level), was football commentator Les Murray. Together with Warren they would become known as "Mr and Mrs Soccer" and would become the faces of soccer in Australia through their commentary work on SBS Television.

In 1975 at the urging of some former Hungarian soccer greats and youth coach Bob Szatmari, the meeting determined to establish the Australian National Soccer League took place at Soccer House with representatives from all founding clubs, including Hakoah Club (later known as Eastern Suburbs and Sydney City) president and Westfield Group founder and chairman Frank Lowy and Leslie Szatmari. The competition started in 1977 and St. George-Budapest won the competition in 1983. They played in the league until the 1990/91 season. Since then they have played in state competitions. In 2005 the side was controversially axed from the new look New South Wales Premier League and took legal action against the decision along with the Bonnyrigg White Eagles, but were unsuccessful.

Recent history
In 2012 St George competed in the New South Wales Super League, the second tier of state soccer, finishing seventh out of twelve clubs and missing out on the finals. In 2013, St George were promoted from the NPL NSW Men's 2 after taking out the league championship, finishing seven points ahead of the second placed Macarthur Rams FC. The club also won the Grand Final, beating the Rams in the semi-final 2–1 and then beating Mounties Wanderers FC 3–1 in the final. The joy was not to last long, though, as in 2014, the club was immediately relegated back to the second tier of soccer in NSW. Managing just four wins and four draws in 22 games, St George finished dead last in the top tier. The Saints endured another tough season in 2015, finishing third last in the NPL NSW Men's 2.

In 2017 the club played most senior home fixtures out of Seymour Shaw Park, also playing one game at St George Stadium, Fraser Park and Blacktown Football Park. This didn't seem to deter St George as the side finished in 2nd place, losing the semi final to Mt Druitt Town Rangers FC 4–2.

Due to the dilapidated state of St George Stadium, the club played senior fixtures out of Rockdale Ilinden Sports Centre in 2018 and 2019. In 2018, St George finished in 2nd place in the league and won the NPL NSW 2 grand final, but were not promoted due to the 'Club Championship' ranking which takes into consideration the performance of the U20 and U18 sides. In 2019, St George finished 10th in the 14-team NPL NSW 2 season.

During the 2019 season, St George reached the FFA Cup round of 32 after beating clubs such as SD Raiders, APIA Leichhardt Tigers and Dulwich Hill, but lost to Sydney United 58 in a 5–3 thriller after two goals from Mushi Kokubo and a stoppage time equaliser.

Honours 
 National Soccer League
Champions: 1983
Runner Up: 1982

 NSL Cup
Runner Up: 1979

 NSW 1st Division/NPL NSW 1
Champions: 1967, 1971, 1974, 1975, 1981
Runner Up: 1962, 1964, 1965, 1969, 1970, 1972, 1976
Minor Premiers: 1962, 1972, 1976

Federation Cup & Waratah Cup
Winners 1964, 1972
Runner Up: 1966, 1974

 NSW 2nd Division/NPL NSW 2/NSW League One
Champions: 2013, 2018
Minor Premiers: 2013

Season results

Notable players 
  Osvaldo Ardiles joined St. George Saints FC for the Australian 1985 National Soccer League season on loan from Tottenham Hotspur. He was included in the List of NSL players, which was constructed exclusively to those players who had made at least one appearance in the competition between 1977 and 2004.
  Francis Adoboe participated in the Australian 1989 National Soccer League season and was included in the List of NSL players, which was constructed exclusively to those players who had made at least one appearance in the competition between 1977 and 2004.
  Isadore Acosta became the first Paraguayan to play soccer in Australia. Acosta played as a forward and finished 7th with St George Saints FC in the Australian 1978 National Soccer League season, making one appearance as a substitute in a 1–0 home loss against West Adelaide SC on 4 June. Acosta entered the field as a substitute in the 40th minute for Carlos Mendez and was replaced in the 75th minute for Emery Holmik. Acosta was included in the List of NSL players, which was constructed exclusively to those players who had made at least one appearance in the competition between 1977 and 2004.
  Fred Aitken participated in the Australian 1977 National Soccer League season and was included in the List of NSL players, which was constructed exclusively to those players who had made at least one appearance in the competition between 1977 and 2004.
  Roy Cotton participated in the 1979, 1980, 1981, 1985 and 1986 National Soccer League seasons, across two spells with the club.
  Chris Cahill brother of Australia's all-time top goal scorer Tim Cahill was born in Sydney but played for Samoa three times and scored in two of those appearances. Cahill played for St George from 2006 to 2012.

References

External links 
 
 OZ Football club page
 Socceraust

National Soccer League (Australia) teams
National Premier Leagues clubs
Soccer clubs in Sydney
Association football clubs established in 1950
1950 establishments in Australia
FC
Diaspora sports clubs in Australia
Hungarian-Australian culture